Peter Adrian Howell (born 29 July 1941) is a British academic and historian.

Career
Howell began his career in 1964 as an assistant lecturer at the University of London; he later was promoted to lecturer in the Latin Department at Bedford College, where he remained until 1985. He moved to the Classics Department of the Royal Holloway and Bedford New College as lecturer from 1985 until 1994, and as senior lecturer from 1994-99.

Affiliations
 Westminster Cathedral Art Committee (1974–91)
 Dept. of Art and Architecture Liturgy Commission,  Roman Catholic Bishops' Conference for England and Wales (1977–84)
 Churches Committee, English Heritage (1984–88)
 Westminster Cathedral Art and Architecture Committee (1993–present)
 Archdiocese of Westminster Historic Churches Committee (1995–99)
 Roman Catholic Historic Churches Committee for Wales and Herefordshire (1995 to present)

Writings
 Victorian Churches (1968)
 Companion Guide to North Wales (with Elisabeth Beazley, 1975)
 Companion Guide to South Wales (with Elisabeth Beazley, 1977)
 A Commentary on Book I of the Epigrams of Martial (1980),
 The Faber Guide to Victorian Churches (ed with Ian Sutton, 1989)
 Martial: The Epigrams, Book V (1996)

References

External links
Westminster Cathedral website
Books by Peter Howell

1941 births
Living people
British classical scholars
British historians
British Roman Catholics
Place of birth missing (living people)
Academics of Bedford College, London
Academics of Royal Holloway, University of London
Classical scholars of the University of London